Ronnie Williams ( – 1987) was a Welsh international footballer. He was part of the Wales national football team, playing 2 matches. He played his first match on 29 September 1934 against England and his last match on 21 November 1934 against Scotland. On club level he played for Swansea Town, Chester and Newcastle United.

See also
 List of Wales international footballers (alphabetical)

References

1907 births
1987 deaths
Welsh footballers
Wales international footballers
Swansea City A.F.C. players
Chester City F.C. players
Newcastle United F.C. players
Place of birth missing
Date of death missing
Association footballers not categorized by position